Arsaces or Arsakes (Graecized form of Old Persian  ) is the eponymous Greek form of the dynastic name of the Parthian Empire of Iran adopted by all epigraphically attested rulers of the Arsacid dynasties.

Kings of this name include:
Arsaces I of Parthia, c. 247–211 BC
Arsaces II of Parthia, c. 211–191 BC, in older sequences known as 'Artabanus I'
Arsaces of Pontus, Roman Client King of Pontus in the second half of the 1st century BC, son of Pharnaces II of Pontus
Arsaces I of Armenia, son of Artabanus III of Parthia, King of Armenia in 35
Arsaces II (Arshak II), King of Armenia c.350–368
Arsaces III (Arshak III), King of Armenia 378–387
Arsakes, a minor Indo-Scythian ruler

Others
Arsaces, son of King Khosrov IV of Armenia 
Arsaces (conspirator) - A Byzantine Armenian, instigator of Artabanes plot against Justinian I

See also
Arash (given name)
Ashk (given name), Arshak, Arshaka